{{Taxobox
| name = Taeniotes subocellatus
| image = 
| image_caption = 
| regnum = Animalia
| phylum = Arthropoda
| classis = Insecta
| ordo = Coleoptera
| subordo = Polyphaga
| superfamilia = Cerambycoidea
| familia = Cerambycidae
| subfamilia = Lamiinae
| genus = Taeniotes
| species = T. subocellatus
| binomial = Taeniotes subocellatus| binomial_authority = (Olivier, 1792)
| synonyms =
 Cerambyx ocellatus Fabricius, 1801
 Cerambyx subocellatus Olivier, 1792
 Monochamus decoratus Laporte de Castelnau, 1840
 Taeniotes decoratus (Laporte de Castelnau), Thomson, 1859
}}Taeniotes subocellatus''' is a species of flat-faced longhorn beetles in the subfamily Lamiinae of the family Cerambycidae.

Basic color of body is dark brown, with large yellow dorsal spots.

Distribution
This species is present in Guyana, Suriname and Venezuela.

References

External links
  Inventaire entomologique 2009-2010
 Encyclopaedia of Life
 Bruno Chaves Animais

simplex
Beetles described in 1792